The ovarian surface epithelium, also called the germinal epithelium of Waldeyer, or coelomic epithelium is a layer of simple squamous-to-cuboidal epithelial cells covering the ovary.

The term germinal epithelium is a misnomer as it does not give rise to primary follicles.

Composition
These cells are derived from the mesoderm during embryonic development and are closely related to the mesothelium of the peritoneum. The germinal epithelium gives the ovary a dull gray color as compared with the shining smoothness of the peritoneum; and the transition between the mesothelium of the peritoneum and the cuboidal cells which cover the ovary is usually marked by a line around the anterior border of the ovary.

Diseases
Ovarian surface epithelium can give rise to surface epithelial-stromal tumor.

References

External links

Mammal female reproductive system